Whole World may refer to:

Bütün Dünya ("Whole World"), a Turkish publication
The Whole World, a band formed by Kevin Ayers, later known as Kevin Ayers and The Whole World
A Whole World, a sculpture by Dudu Gerstein

Songs
"Heel de wereld" ("The Whole World"), the Dutch entry in the 1958 Eurovision song contest
"The Whole World",  Big Boi and Dre Present... Outkast, Outkast, 2001
"The Whole World", Walked All Night Long, Louisiana Red and Lefty Dizz, 1976
"Whole World", Back to the Street, Petra, 1986
"The Whole World", Dragon Ball Z Hit Song Collection V: Journey of Light, 1990
"The Whole World", Converging Conspiracies, Comecon, 1993
"The Whole World", Photographs & Tidalwaves, Holland, 2003
"The Whole World", Really Really Happy, The Muffs, 2004
"The Whole World", Songs I Wrote and Later Recorded, John McLaughlin, 2006
"Whole World", Shine Through, Aloe Blacc, 2006
"The Whole World", American Hunger, MF Grimm, 2006
"The Whole World", Full Circle, Xzibit, 2006
"The Whole World", Sound of a Rebel, Outlandish, 2009
"The Whole World", The Words You Don't Swallow, Anarbor, 2010
"Whole World", Sincerely Me, James Cottrial, 2010
"Whole World", single, The Drifters, 2013
"The Whole World", single, Consequence, 2014
"Whole World", Let It Fly, Jonny Diaz, 2014
"Whole World", soundtrack of The Boxtrolls, Dario Marianelli, 2014
"The Whole World", single, Litesound, 2017
"Whole World", Feet of Clay, Earl Sweatshirt, 2019

See also

Whole Earth (disambiguation)
Worldwide (disambiguation)